Mr. Nilsson (Swedish Herr Nilsson) is Pippi Longstocking's monkey in the fictional books by Astrid Lindgren, and subsequent films and television episodes. 

"Herr Nilsson" is also the name of a pop group from Bergen, Norway. They have released three LPs – I'm No Elvis (2005), Downhill Thrill (2007) and Long Live Herr Nilsson (2010) – and one EP, Tuesday Is My Birthday (2008).

References

External links 

Astrid Lindgren characters
Fictional monkeys
Male characters in literature
Pippi Longstocking

sv:Pippi Långstrump#Persongalleri